Thomas O'Day (8 October 1873 – 2 September 1905) was an Australian rules footballer who played for North Melbourne in the Victorian Football Association (VFA), then for the Imperials (a forerunner of ) in the West Australian Football Association (WAFA), and then for  in the Victorian Football League (VFL).

Football
O'Day made his debut for the Carlton Football Club in Round 1 of the 1898 season. He was only with Carlton for the single season, playing 13 games and kicking 8 goals. The 8 goals he kicked made him the club's leading goal-kicker for that year -- the lowest leading goal tally in the club's history.

See also
 The Footballers' Alphabet

Notes

References
 'Follower', "The Footballers' Alphabet", The Leader, (Saturday, 23 July 1898), p.17.
 Holmesby, Russell & Main, Jim (2014). The Encyclopedia of AFL Footballers: every AFL/VFL player since 1897 (10th ed.). Melbourne, Victoria: Bas Publishing.

External links
 
 
 Blueseum: Tommy O'Day

1870 births
Australian rules footballers from Melbourne
Carlton Football Club players
North Melbourne Football Club (VFA) players
Imperials Football Club players
1905 deaths
People from North Melbourne